Kadavil Malika is a historic place in India, associated with the origin of the Maramon Convention. It is a house in Kallissery on the banks of River Pamba and was built by Unnittan Kathanar (1767–1852) and his son Abraham Kathanar (1822–1884) also known as Kadavil Achen, in the early 19th century.

By 1877, there were two factions in the Malankara Church, known as Methran Kakshi and Bava Kakshi. By a court verdict on 12 July 1889, Methran Kakshi lost all the properties. Just before the verdict was given, on 5 September 1888, 12 members of the Methran Kakshi formed a missionary group called "Mar Thoma Evangelistic Association." This Missionary Movement was started in the wake of the Reformation Movement pioneered by Abraham Malpan, often known as "the Martin Luther of the East". It marked the resurgence of the Ancient Church in Kerala and has given new life and inspiration for the total renewal and mission of the Marthoma church.

The 12 founding members met at Kadavil Malika, the house of Chempakassseril Kadavil Mathuchen (1860–1897) and Chempakasseril Kadavil Abraham (sons of Abraham Kathanar and grandsons of Unnithan Kathanar).

These 12 members are considered to be the founding fathers of the Maramon convention. 
The names of these 12 members are:-

 Kottarathil Thomas Kasseessa, Chengannur
 Edavamvelil Mathai, Eraviperoor.
 Kottooreth Yohannan, Chengannur
 Chempakasseril Kadavil Abraham, Kallissery
 Chakkalayil Cherian Upadesi, Puthencavu
 Chempakasseril Kadavil Mathuchen, Kallissery.
 Azhakinal Thommi, Kallooppara
 Nathaniel Upadesi, Chengannur
 Kurichiath (Vattadiyil) Ittiyavara, Niranam
 Arangat Philipose, Maramon
 Ottaplammoottil Kunju Mathew, Kallissery
 Kochumannil Skariah, Edayaranmula

(This historic Kadavil Malika was reclaimed by the Marthoma Church and was renovated and recommissioned on Saturday, 10 September 2005.)

See also
 Marthoma Church
 Maramon Convention

References

External links
Kadavil Malika Video on Youtube
Mar Thoma Evangelistic Association

Mar Thoma Syrian Church
Historic sites in India